opened in Nobeoka, Miyazaki Prefecture, Japan, in 1963. The collection relates to the history, culture, and folklore of Nobeoka with a particular emphasis on the Naitō clan; as of March 2015, it comprised some 53,000 archaeological materials, 11,780 historical materials, 3,200 folk materials, and 760 artworks (primarily prints and yōga). Currently being redeveloped at a projected cost of ¥2.8 bn, the museum is scheduled to reopen in 2022.

See also

 History of Miyazaki Prefecture
 List of Historic Sites of Japan (Miyazaki)
 List of Cultural Properties of Japan - paintings (Miyazaki)

References

Museums in Miyazaki Prefecture
Museums established in 1963
1963 establishments in Japan
Nobeoka, Miyazaki